Barrundia is a valley and municipality located in the province of Álava, in the Basque Country, northern Spain. It includes the village of Guevara (Gebara). Ozaeta is the capital. A stream of the same name runs through the valley, pouring into the Ullíbarri-Gamboa reservoir.

References

External links
 BARRUNDIA in the Bernardo Estornés Lasa - Auñamendi Encyclopedia 

Municipalities in Álava